Murzin (Russian: Мурзин, IPA: [mʊrˈzʲin]) is a Russian masculine surname originating from the word murza, meaning Tatar prince; its feminine counterpart is Murzina. Notable persons with the surname include:

Dave Murzin (born 1963), American realtor and politician
Elena Murzina (born 1984), Russian rhythmic gymnast 
Leonid Murzin (1930–1996), Soviet and Russian linguist
Volodar Murzin (born 2006), Russian chess player
Yevgen Murzin (born 1965), Soviet and Ukrainian basketball player and coach
 Yevgeny Murzin (1914–1970), Russian audio engineer

References

Russian-language surnames